Nils Andersson (24 October 1889 – 2 September 1973) was a Swedish breaststroke swimmer. He competed in two events at the 1912 Summer Olympics.

References

External links
 

1889 births
1973 deaths
Olympic swimmers of Sweden
Swimmers at the 1912 Summer Olympics
Swimmers from Stockholm
Swedish male breaststroke swimmers